Barr, Illinois may refer to:
Barr, Macoupin County, Illinois, an unincorporated community in Macoupin County
Barr, Sangamon County, Illinois, an unincorporated community in Sangamon County